CEBS may stand for:

Committee of European Banking Supervisors, a former independent advisory group on banking supervision in the European Union
Chitwan English Boarding School, a school in the Chitwan District, Nepal
Centre for Excellence in Basic Sciences, an institute in Mumbai, India.
Communication Enabled Business System or Communication Enabled Business Process, a process for optimizing business processes